Bukowiec  is a village in the administrative district of Gmina Górowo Iławeckie, within Bartoszyce County, Warmian-Masurian Voivodeship, in northern Poland, close to the border with the Kaliningrad Oblast of Russia.

Notable residents
 Gotthilf Christoph Wilhelm Busolt (1771–1831), German scholar

Population 

1933: 603
1939: 587
2008: 780

References

Bukowiec